Charles Henry Gordon-Lennox, 10th Duke of Richmond, 10th Duke of Lennox, 10th Duke of Aubigny, 5th Duke of Gordon (19 September 1929 – 1 September 2017), styled Lord Settrington until 1935 and Earl of March and Kinrara between 1935 and 1989, was an English peer and landowner.

The son of Frederick Gordon-Lennox, 9th Duke of Richmond, he succeeded to the titles when his father died in 1989. The seat of the Dukes of Richmond is Goodwood House in Sussex. The 10th Duke moved to the smaller Molecomb House nearby when his son Lord March took over control of the estate and moved into the main house with his family.

Career
The Duke was educated at Eton College and William Temple College, a now-defunct Church of England theological college (see William Temple Foundation). He was a 2nd Lieutenant in the 60th Rifles from 1949 to 1950. He was a Chartered Accountant and spent nearly two decades working in the corporate world.

He held a number of civic, business and church appointments, including Chancellor of the University of Sussex from 1985 to 1998, and Church Commissioner from 1963 to 1976; member of the General Synod of the Church of England from 1960 to 1980 and on committees of the World Council of Churches. He was a Deputy Lieutenant of West Sussex from 1975 until 1990, and Lord Lieutenant from 1990 to 1994. He was also a patron of Prisoners Abroad, a charity supporting the welfare of Britons imprisoned overseas and their families.

In 2006, he founded Sussex Community Foundation in response to severe social deprivation that he had observed throughout Sussex. In his own words:

Family 
The then Earl of March married in 1951  Susan Monica Grenville-Grey (b. 1932), daughter of Colonel Cecil Everard Montague Grenville-Grey and Louise Monica (née Morrison-Bell). They had three children:
 Lady Ellinor Caroline Gordon-Lennox (28 July 1952)
 Charles Gordon-Lennox, 11th Duke of Richmond (8 January 1955). He married Sally Clayton on 3 July 1976 and was divorced in 1989. They have one daughter. He remarried Hon. Janet Elizabeth Astor (daughter of William Waldorf Astor, 3rd Viscount Astor) in 1991. They have four children.
 Lady Louisa Elizabeth Gordon-Lennox (14 March 1967). She married Benjamin "Ben" Collings on 1 November 1997. They have four children:
 Felicity Grace Collings (1999)
 George Cecil Collings (23 December 2003)

The Duke and Duchess, then Earl and Countess of March, attracted press attention when they adopted two girls of mixed race during a time of anti-immigrant sentiment and when interracial marriage was frowned upon:
 Lady Maria Gordon-Lennox (1959). She married Mr. Handy. They have one daughter:
 Michaela Handy
 Lady Naomi Gordon-Lennox (1962). She married Gavin Burke in 1999 and they were divorced. They have three children.

Both girls were born in England to white mothers, with a Ghanaian and a black South African father respectively. Adopted children of peers were not allowed to use styles, titles and courtesy titles until a Royal Warrant issued in April 2004 meant that Maria and Naomi were elevated as Ladies, as daughters of a duke of the realm.

Ancestry

Arms

References

External links
 

1929 births
2017 deaths
210
310
Dukes of Aubigny
205
Charles
People educated at Eton College
Lord-Lieutenants of West Sussex
King's Royal Rifle Corps officers
English Anglicans
Members of the General Synod of the Church of England
Richmond